Agni Charalambous (born 2 September 1975) is a Cypriot athlete. She competed in the women's high jump at the 2000 Summer Olympics.

References

1975 births
Living people
Athletes (track and field) at the 2000 Summer Olympics
Cypriot female high jumpers
Olympic athletes of Cyprus
Place of birth missing (living people)